X19 may refer to:

Aeroflot Flight X-19 in Aeroflot accidents and incidents in the 1960s
Curtiss-Wright X-19, American experimental tiltrotor of the early 1960s
Fiat X1/9, car developed for release for European sales in 1972 to replace the 850 Spider by Bertone
Phantom X-19, speculated to be a top-secret stealth fighter in U.S. service
X19 (New York City bus)